Shevlin can refer to a community in the United States:

 The city of Shevlin, Minnesota
 Shevlin Township, Clearwater County, Minnesota